115 East Jones Street is a home in Savannah, Georgia, United States. It is located on historic Jones Street and was constructed in 1853.

The building is part of the Savannah Historic District, and in a survey by the Historic Savannah Foundation, it was found to be of significant status.

Built as part of the three-unit Eliza Ann Jewett Row House, number 115 featured in the 1997 movie Midnight in the Garden of Good and Evil as the venue for the party hosted by Joe Odom. He  was house-sitting for its owner, who was in New York.

Eliza Ann Jewett Row House

See also
Buildings in Savannah Historic District

References

East Jones Street 115
Houses completed in 1853
Savannah Historic District